Williamstown is a borough in Dauphin County, Pennsylvania, United States. Formerly, anthracite coal mines and hosiery mills were located in the borough. The population was 1,303 at the 2020 census.

Williamstown is part of the Harrisburg–Carlisle Metropolitan Statistical Area.

Geography
Williamstown is located in northeastern Dauphin County at  (40.581075, -76.618296). It is in the valley of  Wiconisco Creek, between Big Lick Mountain to the north and Berry Mountain to the south. U.S. Route 209 passes to the south of the borough, leading northeast  to Pottsville and west  to Elizabethville.

Demographics

As of the census of 2000, there were 1,433 people, 611 households, and 406 families residing in the borough. The population density was 5,692.2 people per square mile (2,213.1/km2). There were 716 housing units at an average density of 2,844.1 per square mile (1,105.8/km2). The racial makeup of the borough was 99.02% White, 0.14% African American, 0.07% Native American, 0.21% Asian, 0.07% from other races, and 0.49% from two or more races. Hispanic or Latino of any race were 0.35% of the population.

There were 611 households, 25.7% of which included children under the age of 18.  49.3% were married couples living together, 11.6% had a female householder, and 33.4% were non-families. 29.0% of all households consisted of individuals, and 15.9% were single residents 65 years of age or older. The average household size was 2.35 and the average family size was 2.83.

The borough population included 21.8% under the age of 18; 8.0% from 18 to 24; 27.5% from 25 to 44; 22.0% from 45 to 64; and 20.7% who were 65 years of age or older. The median age was 40 years. For every 100 females there were 90.1 males. For every 100 females age 18 and over, there were 86.5 males.

The median income for a household in the borough was $33,359, and the median income for a family was $36,548. Males had a median income of $31,855 versus $23,125 for females. The per capita income for the borough was $15,744. About 11.9% of families and 14.7% of the population were below the poverty line, including 18.6% of those under age 18 and 10.8% of those age 65 or over.

Notable person
 Gary Collins, Played college ball for the University of Maryland Terrapins from 1959-61 and was an NFL player for the Cleveland Browns from 1962 to 1971.

References

External links

Populated places established in 1869
Harrisburg–Carlisle metropolitan statistical area
Boroughs in Dauphin County, Pennsylvania
1869 establishments in Pennsylvania